Keratinocyte differentiation-associated protein is a protein that in humans is encoded by the KRTDAP gene.

References

Further reading